Pico Humboldt is Venezuela's second highest peak, at 4,925 metres above sea level. It is located in the Sierra Nevada de Merida, in the Venezuelan Andes of (Mérida State). The peak, its sister peak Pico Bonpland, and the surrounding páramos are protected by the Sierra Nevada National Park. The mountain is named after German explorer and naturalist Alexander von Humboldt.

Glaciers

The summit was formerly surrounded by glaciers, including the two largest out of the four glaciers remaining in the country (the other two smaller glaciers were on Pico Bolívar). The glaciers on Humboldt Peak (as most tropical glaciers) have been receding fast since the 1970s. By 2009, all but one glacier, the Humboldt Glacier, had vanished. The remaining glacier covers an area of 0.1 km2 and is forecast to melt completely within a decade.

References

 Jahn A, Observaciones glaciológicas de los Andes venezolanos. Cult. Venez. 1925, 64:265-80

External link 

Humboldt
Glaciers of Venezuela
Geography of Mérida (state)
Páramos
Sierra Nevada National Park (Venezuela)